Samuel A. Greaves is a retired United States Air Force Lieutenant General who is now a vice president and the chief architect for space and launch at Boeing. In the U.S. Air Force, he last served as the Commander of the Missile Defense Agency. Prior to that, he was the Commander of the Space and Missile Systems Center.

References

External links
 

Year of birth missing (living people)
Living people
Place of birth missing (living people)
United States Air Force generals